Located in Oguni Town, Aso District on the border between Kumamoto and Oita Prefectures. This waterfall is 9m tall with a width of 20m.

References 

Waterfalls of Japan